Common law offences are crimes under English criminal law, the related criminal law of some Commonwealth countries, and under some U.S. State laws. They are offences under the common law, developed entirely by the law courts, having no specific basis in statute.

Australia
Under the criminal law of Australia the Criminal Code Act 1995 (Commonwealth) abolished all common law offences at the federal level.  The Australian Capital Territory, the Northern Territory, Queensland, Tasmania and Western Australia have also abolished common law offences, but they still apply in New South Wales, South Australia and Victoria. Although some common law offences still exist in New South Wales, many common law offences – for example nightwalking, riot, rout, affray, keeping of bawdy houses, champerty and maintenance, eavesdropping and being a common scold – have been abolished in that State.

Canada
In Canada the consolidation of criminal law in the Criminal Code, enacted in 1953, involved the abolition of all common law offences except contempt of court (preserved by section 9 of the Code) and contempt of Parliament (preserved by section 18 of the Constitution Act, 1867).

England and Wales
In England and Wales, the Law Commission's programme of codification of the criminal law included the aim of abolishing all the remaining common law offences and replacing them, where appropriate, with offences precisely defined by statute. Common law offences were seen as unacceptably vague and open to development by the courts in ways that might offend the principle of certainty. However, neither the Law Commission nor the UK Parliament have completed the necessary revisions of the law, so some common law offences still exist. In England and Wales, common law offences are punishable by unlimited fines and unlimited imprisonment.

List of offences under the common law of England

This list includes offences that have been abolished or codified in one or more or all jurisdictions.

A
Accessory
Administration of drugs with intent to enable or assist the commission of a crime
Administration of poison with intent to injure, aggrieve or annoy any person
Affray
Arson
Assault with intent to rape
Assault with intent to rob
Attempt

B
Barratry
Battery
Being a common scold
Blasphemy
Blasphemous libel
Breach of prison (escape with use of force)
Bribery
Buggery
Burglary

C
Champerty
Cheating
Common assault aka assault
Compounding treason
Compounding a felony
Concealment of treasure trove
Conspiracy
Contempt of court a.k.a. criminal contempt, contumacy
Contempt of the sovereign

D
Defamatory libel (sometimes known as criminal libel, although this can refer to several offences of libel)
Disabling in order to commit an indictable offence (in other words choking or strangulation)

E
Eavesdropping
Embracery
Escape from lawful custody
Espionage
Extortion

F
Fabrication of false evidence
Forcible entry
Forcible detainer
Forgery

H
Harbouring a fugitive or felon

I
Incitement

K
Kidnapping

L
Larceny

M
Maintenance

Manslaughter
Mayhem
Misprision of felony (disputed – alleged not to exist)
Misprision of treason (disputed – alleged to be statutory)

Murder

N
Nightwalking (so as to cause alarm)

O
Obscene libel
Outraging public decency

P
Petty treason
Piracy
Challenging to fight
Public mischief (disputed – held to no longer exist)
Public nuisance

R
Rape
Rescue/rescuing a prisoner in custody
Riot
Robbery
Rout (unlawful assembly with intent to riot)
Running a disorderly house

S
Sedition
Seditious libel

T
Theft

U
Unlawful assembly

W
Wilful fireraising and culpable and reckless fireraising

High crimes and misdemeanours

New Zealand
In New Zealand the ability to be proceeded against at common law for being a party to a criminal offence was abolished by section six of the Criminal Code Act 1893. Section five of the Crimes Act, 1908 (which replaced the 1893 enactment), and section 9 of the Crimes Act 1961 (which replaced the 1908 enactment) affirmed the abolition of criminal proceedings at common law, with the exception of contempt of court and of offences tried by courts martial.

United States
The notion that common law offenses could be enforced in federal courts was found to be unconstitutional by the U.S. Supreme Court in United States v. Hudson and Goodwin, 11 U.S. 32 (1812). A woman, Anne Royall, was nonetheless found guilty of being a common scold in Washington, D.C. in 1829; a newspaper paid her fine. Some have argued that common law offences are inconsistent with the prohibition of ex post facto laws.

At the state level, the situation varies. Some states, such as New Jersey, have abolished common law crimes (see State v. Palendrano), while others have chosen to continue to recognize them. In some states, the elements of many crimes are defined mostly or entirely by common law, i.e., by prior judicial decisions. For instance, Michigan's penal code does not define the crime of murder: while the penalties for murder are laid out in statute, the actual elements of murder, and their meaning, is entirely set out in case law.

See also
Nullum crimen, nulla poena sine praevia lege poenali

References

External links
CASE LAW on free B.E.A.G.L.E.S. legal resource centre

Common law
English criminal law
Common law offences in England and Wales